Edward Roberts (born as Edwin Lionel Rowland) (January 20, 1903 – March 3, 1968), better known as Eddie Roberts, was an American Welterweight/Middleweight boxer,actor and a World War I, World War II and Korean War veteran who competed from 1922 to 1931. He held the title of Pacific Northwest Welterweight Champion and was a serious contender for the World Welterweight championship in 1926-1927.

Early life
Eddie Roberts was born on January 20, 1903, in Anacortes, Washington to father Edwin Luther Rowland, the owner of a Livery and transport business, and mother Mamie Kreamer. The youngest of two brothers, he lived in Anacortes up until at least the age of 7, reportedly he later grew up in Alameda. His father passed away when Roberts was seven years old due to an automobile accident and subsequent drowning. Roberts attended Whitney Primary School. Roberts filled his draft registration card under a fake name on September 12, 1918 at the age of 15. He joined the United States Navy and was stationed at the Brooklyn Navy Yard after which being moved to the battleship USS Arkansas in Guantánamo Bay in 1920 at the latest and gaining the rank of fireman and afterwards water tender. On November 27, 1929, Roberts married Agnes Serene Anderson.

Amateur career
While being stationed on the USS Arkansas, Roberts engaged in friendly boxing matches with his fellow sailors which caught the attention of the ship's athletic director who induced him to join the Atlantic squadron fistic competition. Roberts proceeded to win the middleweight championship of the navy.

Professional career
Roberts left the Navy and asked Jack Connors in late 1921 if Connors would be his coach (Connors was also the coach of future Welterweight World champion, Freddie Steele and briefly the coach of  the future 15th governor of Washington Albert Rosellini), Connors accepted, Roberts left the Navy and had his professional debut on September 2, 1922, at the age of 19 in the Welterweight weight class with a win against Fred Kelly. Roberts' popularity and skill grew quickly, and by 1923, he was participating in main event fights like the one at the now Kaiser Convention Center against Oakland Jimmy Duffy.

On March 6, 1924, Roberts became the Pacific Northwest Welterweight Champion after winning against Ted Krache in a round six points decision, 19 days later he lost the title to Bobby Harper but would later regain it after winning against Harper on November 20, 1924. Roberts would lose the title again 19 days later and would never regain it.

Roberts's most notable event of his career was on December 4, 1926, where he fought against Joe Dundee and won in a first round knockout after only 4 seconds earning him 400 dollars, a big amount of publicity and the nickname KO. Roberts would however lose the rematch in a ten-round unanimous decision a month later in front of over 18 thousand spectators inside Madison Square Garden. Dundee would go on to become World Welterweight Champion.

On March 22, 1927, Roberts won a bout against Olympic athlete Jack Zivic with a round twelve-points decision.

On April 4, 1927, Roberts lost a bout against Olympic athlete Al Mello with a round-one knockout.

At the end of 1927, Roberts was seventh place in the Welterweight division.

On March 12, 1928, Roberts lost a bout against future Welterweight and Middleweight champion Young Corbett III with a round-nine knockout.

On February 7, 1930, Roberts had a draw with Gorilla Jones after fighting for ten rounds.

Retirement and life after
On August 19, 1931, at the age of 28 Roberts sustained two small fractures of the jaw, this occurred during his bout with Buddy Gorman. This incident would be the final catalyst that would push Roberts into his retirement from boxing.

After Roberts retirement he had multiple roles in movies and shorts like: Roadhouse Nights, The Naggers at the Ringside, The Screen Test, On Such A Night , Some Blondes Are Dangerous, Submarine D-1 and Love on toast.

In 1933, Roberts was working as a bartender in San Francisco.

In late 1933, Roberts was a bartender aboard the Dollar Liner SS President Hoover in the Trans-Pacific trade.

In 1935, Roberts was the owner of a Nightclub near San Francisco.

In 1937, Roberts was the owner of a Tavern on Mason Street in San Francisco.

In 1940, Roberts was working as a bartender in a hotel lounge in Redding.

Roberts loved to hunt and fish and planned to build an outing resort in California.

In 1942 at the age of 39, Roberts lived in San Francisco and joined the Navy again and regained his rank of water tender, fighting in World War II.

In 1950, Roberts was again working as a bartender in Seattle.

Between 1950 and early 1953, Roberts fought in the Korean War on troop transport ship USNS David C. Shanks as a watertender and on the American S.S Fairisle as a Deck Engineer.

On July 19, 1954, Roberts married Colletta M. Johnson in San Francisco.

In 1955, he was working on the SS Young America as an Oiler.

Edward Roberts died on March 3, 1968, in Alameda at the age of 65. and was buried in Willamette National Cemetery under his fake name and birth date.

Style of play
Roberts was a counter fighter with a strong short left hook who refused to play aggressively until his opponent was weakened.

Personal life
Roberts changed his name from Edward Lionel Rowland to Eddie/Edward Roberts for "fighting purposes".

Roberts was married multiple times but had no children.

Professional boxing record
All information in this section is derived from BoxRec, unless otherwise stated.

Official record

External links 
Lionel Rowland | Anacortes Museum

References 

1903 births
1968 deaths
American male boxers
Boxers from Washington (state)
Sportspeople from Washington (state)
Sportspeople from Tacoma, Washington
Sportspeople from Alameda, California
People from Washington (state)
People from Tacoma, Washington
People from Alameda, California
Welterweight boxers
Middleweight boxers
United States Navy sailors
American actors
American people of World War I
American people of World War II
Military personnel from Washington (state)
United States Navy personnel of World War I
United States Navy personnel of World War II
United States Navy personnel of the Korean War